The 1994 United States Senate election in New Mexico was held November 8, 1994. Incumbent Democrat Jeff Bingaman won re-election to a third term.

Democratic primary

Candidates 
 Jeff Bingaman, incumbent U.S. Senator

Results

Republican primary

Candidates 
 Colin R. McMillan, businessman and former State Representative
 Bill Turner, water broker
 Robin Dozier Otten

Results

General election

Candidates 
 Jeff Bingaman (D), incumbent U.S. Senator
 Colin R. McMillan (R), businessman and former State Representative

Results

See also 
 1994 United States Senate elections

References

External links 

New Mexico
1994
1994 New Mexico elections